Mendham Priory was a priory in Suffolk, England.

References

Monasteries in Suffolk